Emer Gwynne Morganna Kenny (born 10 October 1989) is a British actress and screenwriter. She is best known for playing Zsa Zsa Carter in EastEnders and its spin-off EastEnders: E20, Danielle Reeves in Pramface and Penelope "Bunty" Windermere in Father Brown.

Career
Kenny made her professional debut in the 2007 BBC television drama Coming Down the Mountain, and, in 2009, she made her film debut in Phil Claydon's Lesbian Vampire Killers. She played the role of Kate in an improvisational BBC production called Freefall written and directed by Dominic Savage, which was screened in 2009. In January 2010, Kenny began her role in the EastEnders spin-off EastEnders: E20 as Zsa Zsa Carter as well as in EastEnders itself. Kenny was cast in the role of Zsa Zsa after writing the second episode of EastEnders: E20. A second series of EastEnders: E20 was announced in April 2010, with Kenny returning as a writer, although it was announced the following month that Zsa Zsa would be written out of EastEnders so Kenny could pursue further acting roles. She made her last appearance on 30 September 2010.

In 2010, Kenny was painted by Rolf Harris as Titania from Shakespeare's A Midsummer Night's Dream for an edition of BBC TV's Arena ("Rolf Harris Paints His Dream").

Kenny wrote a further episode of EastEnders: E20 for series three in 2011 and was selected as the youngest ever writer for the BBC Writers Academy where she trained to write for programmes such as EastEnders, Casualty, Holby City, and Doctors. Her first EastEnders episode as a writer was broadcast on 8 May 2012.

She joined the cast of E4's Beaver Falls for its second series playing the character Hope. The second series began airing in early August 2012 with the final episode of the series airing in early September 2012. It was announced on 22 September 2012 that the drama would not be recommissioned.

In 2011, she was cast as Danielle Reeves in the BBC Three dramedy Pramface alongside her Beaver Falls co-star Scarlett Alice Johnson. Pramface piloted in late February 2012 and was met with good reception, so much so the second series was commissioned by the BBC before the first series had even aired. She reprised her role for the second series which began airing in the new year of 2013 and was broadcast a second time on BBC One throughout the summer of 2013. She reprised her role again for a third series which commenced airing in late February 2014.

She played the role of Rachel alongside Matthew Crosby, Ben Clark and Tom Parry in the first series of BBC Three's sitcom Badults which aired in the summer of 2013. A second series was commissioned but it was announced that Kenny would not feature in it.

In 2016, Emer Kenny worked as a scriptwriter on Irish soap Red Rock for a few episodes.

In 2017, she joined the cast of the BBC TV series Father Brown as Penelope "Bunty" Windermere, the wayward niece of Lady Felicia.

In 2021, it was announced that Kenny would write and co-star in the ITV crime drama Karen Pirie, adapted from the Karen Pirie novels of Val McDermid.

Personal life
Kenny was born in the London Borough of Haringey She is of Irish and Welsh heritage.

Kenny married television presenter Rick Edwards in 2016. Kenny gave birth to their son in January 2023.

Filmography

References

External links

1989 births
Living people
English television actresses
People from the London Borough of Haringey
English people of Welsh descent
English soap opera actresses
21st-century English actresses
Actresses from London